Smithtown may refer to:

Smithtown, New York, a town in Suffolk County
Smithtown (CDP), New York, a hamlet and census-designated place (CDP) within the above town
Smithtown (LIRR station), a railroad station in the above town
Smithtown Christian School, a private school in the above town
Smithtown, North Carolina, an unincorporated community in northern Yadkin County
Smithtown, West Virginia, an unincorporated community in Monongalia County
Smithtown, New South Wales, a town in Australia